St. Anthony of Padua Parish - designated for Polish immigrants in Chicopee, Massachusetts, United States.

Founded 1926. It is one of the Polish-American Roman Catholic parishes in New England in the Diocese of Springfield in Massachusetts.

On August 29th 2009 it was announced by His Excellency Bishop Timothy McDonnell that the church of the Nativity of the Blessed Virgin Mary and St. Mary of the Assumption in the Willimansett section of Chicopee were to be merged with St. Anthony of Padua forming the new territorial parish for the Willimansett Section of Chicopee.

Bibliography 
 
 

 The Official Catholic Directory in USA

External links 
  St. Anthony of Padua - Diocesan information

Roman Catholic parishes of Diocese of Springfield in Massachusetts
Polish-American Roman Catholic parishes in Massachusetts
Roman Catholic churches in Chicopee, Massachusetts